Alexei Yurievich Gorshkov (born 30 January 1967) is a Russian ice dancing coach.

Coaching career 
Gorshkov coaches in Odintsovo, near Moscow. His notable senior dance teams are:
 Albena Denkova / Maxim Staviski (2004 World silver medalists; coached until March 2005)
 Oksana Domnina / Maxim Shabalin (2008 European champions, coached until June 2008)
 Ekaterina Riazanova / Ilia Tkachenko
 Nóra Hoffmann / Maxim Zavozin
 Anastasia Platonova / Andrei Maximishin

Notable junior-level dance teams:
 Natalia Romaniuta / Daniil Barantsev (2000 and 2001 World Junior champions)
 Anastasia Gorshkova / Ilia Tkachenko (2005 World Junior bronze medalists)
 Maria Monko / Ilia Tkachenko (2007-2008 Junior Grand Prix Final champions)
 Evgenia Kosigina / Nikolai Moroshkin

Personal life 
Alexei Gorshkov has two daughters, one of whom is former competitive ice dancer Anastasia Gorshkova (born 13 March 1987).

References 

1967 births
Living people
Russian figure skating coaches
Sportspeople from Yekaterinburg